Annette DiMeo Carlozzi is a curator from Austin, TX. She previously served as main curator of the Blanton Museum of Art, the Laguna Gloria Art Museum, Visual Arts Producer for the 1996 Olympics Arts Festival, and the Contemporary Art Center New Orleans. Carlozzi is one of the directors of the Contemporary Austin Crit Group.

References

Living people
Year of birth missing (living people)
American art curators
American women curators
21st-century American women